The title Duke of Albuquerque was created under the royal decree of May 19, 1886, of king Luís I of Portugal in favour of Dom João Afonso da Costa de Sousa de Macedo, 2nd Count of Mesquitela and 4th Viscount of Mesquitela.

List of the dukes of Albuquerque

D. João Afonso da Costa de Sousa de Macedo, 1st Duke of Albuquerque (1815-1890)
D. Luís Alberto Oulman da Costa de Sousa de Macedo, 2nd Duke of Albuquerque (born 1952)

See also
Counts of Mesquitela
Viscounts of Mesquitela
Dukedoms in Portugal

Bibliography
”Nobreza de Portugal e do Brasil" – Vol. II, page 215. Published by Zairol Lda., Lisbon 1989.

External links
Genealogy of the Dukes of Albuquerque, in Portuguese

Dukedoms of Portugal
 
Portuguese nobility
1886 establishments in Portugal